Arhopala singla, the pointed oakblue,  is a butterfly in the family Lycaenidae. It was described by Charles Lionel Augustus de Nicéville in 1885. It is found in the Indomalayan realm (Northwest India, Bhutan, Nepal, Sikkim, Assam, Burma, and Southwest China).

References

External links
Arhopala Boisduval, 1832 at Markku Savela's Lepidoptera and Some Other Life Forms. Retrieved June 3, 2017.

Arhopala
Butterflies described in 1885